Cynthia Toohey (born April 16, 1934 - January 29, 2021) was an American nurse, businesswoman, and Republican politician.

Born in New York City, Toohey graduated from Julia Richman High School in 1953. In 1958, Toohey moved to Alaska and eventually settled in Anchorage. She received her associate degree in nursing from University of Alaska Anchorage and became a registered nurse. Toohey also owned the Crow Creek Mine. She served as chair of the Girdwood, Anchorage Board of Supervisors within the Anchorage Municipality. From 1993 to 1997, Toohey served in the Alaska House of Representatives.

Notes

1934 births
2021 deaths
Politicians from Anchorage, Alaska
Politicians from New York City
University of Alaska Anchorage alumni
American nurses
American women nurses
Women state legislators in Alaska
Republican Party members of the Alaska House of Representatives
Julia Richman Education Complex alumni
21st-century American women